Kristian "Ditch" Davey is an Australian actor known for his role as Evan Jones in the Seven Network's Blue Heelers from 2001 to 2006, and for playing the lead role of Julius Caesar in Netflix Season 2: Master of Rome Roman Empire in 2018.

Early life and education
Davey graduated from the Western Australian Academy of Performing Arts (WAAPA), Perth in 1998.

Career
Not long after leaving the WAAPA in 1998 and the state of Western Australia, he got his first acting job on a Wrigley's Eclipse chewing gum ad. Following this, he was seen on Australian dramas such as All Saints, Above the Law, Water Rats, and the telemovie Do or Die. In 2001, he auditioned for the role of Evan Jones on Blue Heelers. After winning the role, he quit his job as a part-time barman in Sydney and relocated to Melbourne. He also cut his long blonde hair and dyed it brown. His first episode was "Dragged".

In 2006, Blue Heelers was axed after a 12-year-run.  Davey hosted Channel Seven's Police Files: Unlocked before leaving to work on Sea Patrol. In the 2008 series, Davey played SAS officer Jim Roth on a semi-regular basis. He also portrayed Romeo in the 2012 Australian Science-Fiction Film "Crawlspace".  He also had a supporting role in the final season of "Spartacus: War of the Damned". In 2014, Davey starred in the ABC-TV series Black Box, as Dr. Ian Bickman, chief neurosurgeon, opposite Kelly Reilly. In 2017, he joined the cast of the comedy-drama series 800 Words.

In 2018, he landed the lead role of Julius Caesar in Netflix Season 2: Master of Rome Roman Empire,
alongside Jessica Green who played Cleopatra.

From September 2020, Davey began playing neurosurgeon Dr. Christian Green in the Seven Network soap opera Home and Away.

Personal life
Davey has been married to actress Sophia Dunn since 2010. They have two sons. In 2020, the family relocated to Sydney to accommodate Davey's filming commitments with Home and Away.

Awards and nominations
In 2002, Davey won the Logie Award for Most Popular New Male Talent.

Filmography

References

External links

Australian male television actors
Living people
Logie Award winners
Male actors from Melbourne
Western Australian Academy of Performing Arts alumni
Year of birth missing (living people)